Geoffrey Sserunkuma (born 7 June 1983) is a Ugandan international footballer who of recent played for Wakiso Giants FC  and the Uganda national team (the "Cranes") as a striker.

Club career
Operating as striker, Sserukuma played for Police Jinja. He enjoyed success at Kampala City Council FC before a transfer to Ethiopian Premier League club Saint-George SA in July 2007. In summer 2008, he left the club Addis Ababa and moved to Bloemfontein Celtic. In July 2009, he left Bloemfontein Celtic and completed a move to Vasco Da Gama, after falling out with Celtic manager Owen da Gama.

Bidvest Wits
On 6 April 2010, Sserunkuma signed for Bidvest Wits agreeing a two-year deal with the club.

Vasco Da Gama
However, he returned to Vasco Da Gama the following season, playing in the second-tier following the club's relegation from the top flight.

Lweza Football Club
In 2015, Sserunkuma joined Lweza FC. Sserunkuma played for a season at the Lweza F.C and  scored eight goals in that  season.

Kampala City Council
In July  2016, Sserunkuma joined Kampala City Council FC from Lweza Football Club; this was the second stint for Sserunkuma at the Lugogo based club following his first era during 2004 and 2006 seasons.
Sserunkuma opened his goal account with a debut strike against JMC Hippos on Friday 22 August 2016 as the Kampala City Council FC  edged their visitors 2-1 at Phillip Omondi Stadium, Lugogo.
While in 2016/2017 season, Sserunkuma  was the first player to hit double figures that season,  His goal in the third minute against BUL FC was his 10th goal of the season. He last featured  for Kampala City Council when it was playing against Paidha Black Angels FC in Uganda Cup 2017  finals in Arua where  he scored his last goal. Sserunkuma scored 31 goals in all competitions for KCCA FC last season and helped the team win their first ever domestic double.

Buildcon F.C
In July 2017, Sserunkuma joined Buildcon F.C. On 12 August, Sserunkuma scored his first goal for  Buildcon F.C against Lusaka Dynamos in a league match played at Levy Mwanawasa Stadium.

NAPSA Stars
He played for NAPSA Stars F.C. FC for a season.

Wakiso Giants FC
On 7 August 2019, Sserunkuma joined Wakiso Giants FC.

International career
He first began playing for the Cranes in the year 2002.
He was part of the Uganda Cranes team that participated in the 2016 Championship of Africa Nations tournament in Rwanda and scored against Zimbabwe in their 1-1 draw. Sserunkuma was  one of the six locally based players in the Cranes squad which represented Uganda in 2017 Africa Cup of Nations at Gabon.

International statistics

International goals
Scores and results list Uganda's goal tally first.

Honors and achievements

Club
Kampala Capital City Authority FC
 Ugandan Super League: 2017
 Uganda Cup: 2017

Individual
Uganda Super League top scorer (1): 2016-2017
Uganda Super League MVP : 2016-2017
Uganda Super League FANS` PLAYER OF THE YEAR : 2016-2017
Kawowo sports Best XI of the 2016-17 Uganda Premier League:
Most Valuable Player : 2017
Player of the year : 2017
Fans player of the year : 2017

References

External links
 
 

1983 births
Living people
Association football forwards
Ugandan footballers
Uganda international footballers
Sportspeople from Kampala
Ugandan expatriate footballers
Expatriate soccer players in South Africa
Expatriate footballers in Ethiopia
Ugandan expatriates in South Africa
Saint George S.C. players
Vasco da Gama (South Africa) players
Bidvest Wits F.C. players
Bloemfontein Celtic F.C. players
Kampala Capital City Authority FC players
2017 Africa Cup of Nations players
Wakiso Giants FC players
Buildcon F.C. players
Uganda A' international footballers
2016 African Nations Championship players